Badri Narayan (22 July 1929 – 23 September 2013) was an Indian artist, illustrator, author and story-teller.

Narayan began painting with no formal training, and his first public showing was in 1949, followed by a solo show in 1954. He had over 50 solo shows and his work is in several collections, including the National Gallery of Modern Art and the National Museum in New Delhi as well as the Philadelphia Museum of Art's South Asian Collection. Initially, he worked on tile and ceramic, and this informed some of his subsequent watercolours. His paintings are intimate and appealing, often with an element of fantasy, with simple outlines and accessible subject matter in two-dimensional stylised representations. He worked primarily in ink or pastel and watercolour.

He also illustrated children's books and wrote short stories and verse. He has been the subject of a documentary by Mumbai All India Radio, and received numerous awards, including the Padma Shri in 1987 and the Maharashtra Gourav Puruskar in 1990.

Badri Narayan died on 23 September 2013 due to frail health, at a hospital in Bangalore.

Work

As Illustrator
The Mahabharata by Shanta Rameshwar Rao; illustrations by Badri Narayan. (1985, Orient Longman)
The Ramayana by Laxmi Lal, illustrated by Badri Narayan (1988, Orient Longman)

External links
 "Badri Narayan Profile, Interview and Artworks"
 Badri Narayan at colorsofindia.com
 Badri Narayan at indianartcircle.com
 Picture in the Lalit Kala Akademi collection
 Paintings by Badri Narayan at The Arts Trust online gallery (archived)
Article on Badri Narayan in The Hindu newspaper, including a picture of a painting

Article in the Deccan Herald
Picture of house and trees by Badri Narayan
Squares in the PMA
Man Standing in the PMA

1929 births
20th-century Indian painters
Indian illustrators
Indian children's book illustrators
Recipients of the Padma Shri in literature & education
2013 deaths
People from Secunderabad
Indian male painters
Painters from Telangana
20th-century Indian male artists